Tremaine Smith (born April 16, 1986) is an American sprinter who specializes in the 100 and 200 meters.

He won gold and silver medals at the 2005 Pan American Junior Athletics Championships, in the 200 meters and 4×100 meters relay.

References

External links

Houston Cougars track and field bio

1986 births
Living people
Track and field athletes from Houston
American male sprinters
Houston Cougars men's track and field athletes